(Latin for center) may refer to:

Places

In Greenland
 Nuuk Centrum, a district of Nuuk, Greenland
 Centrum Lake, Greenland

In the Netherlands
 Amsterdam-Centrum, the inner-most borough of Amsterdam, Netherlands
 Rotterdam Centrum, a borough of Rotterdam, Netherlands

In Poland
 Centrum, Szczecin, a neighbourhood of Szczecin, Poland
 Osiedle Centrum, Białystok, a district of Białystok, Poland
 Centrum metro station, a metro station in Warsaw, Poland

In Suriname
Centrum, Brokopondo, a resort of Brokopondo District
Centrum, Paramaribo, a resort of Paramaribo District

In Sweden
 Centrum, Gothenburg, a borough of Gothenburg, Sweden
 Centrum, Luleå, a residential area in Luleå, Sweden
 Centrum, Malmö, a city district of Malmö, Sweden
 Centrum, Umeå, a residential area in Umeå, Sweden

Buildings and structures
 The Centrum, the former informal but regularly used name of an arena in Worcester, Massachusetts
 Centrum Arena (disambiguation)

Other uses
 Vertebral centrum, the central portion of the vertebra
 Centrum (arts organization), a Washington state performing arts organization
 Centrum (multivitamin), a brand of multivitamin

See also 
 
 
 Center (disambiguation)
 Centra (disambiguation)
 Centre Party (disambiguation)